Notch homolog 2 N-terminal-like is a family of proteins that in humans consists of 3 proteins (NOTCH2NLA, NOTCH2NLB, and NOTCH2NLC) and is encoded by  NOTCH2NL gene.  It appears to play a key role in the development of the prefrontal cortex, a part of the brain.

NOTCH2NL increases the number of cortical stem cells, which while delaying the generation of neurons ultimately leads to a greater number of neurons and larger brains.  NOTCH2NL copy number loss and gain is associated with various neurological disorders, and they showed that loss of NOTCH2NL in cortical organoids leads to the organoids being smaller, while resulting in premature differentiation of cortical stem cells into neurons. The role of NOTCH2NL in the development of the human brain together with the evolutionary history of NOTCH2NL genes, suggests that the emergence of NOTCH2NL genes may have contributed to the increase in size of the human neocortex which tripled over the last two million years.

References

 
Population genetics
Phylogenetics